Yellow goods are material for construction and earth-moving equipment, quarrying equipment, and fork-lift trucks.  The term is also used to encompass agricultural equipment, such as tractors.

See also
 White goods
 Brown goods

References

Goods (economics)